Owz (also Romanized as Ūz) is a village in Owzrud Rural District, Baladeh District, Nur County, Mazandaran Province, Iran. At the 2006 census, its population was 149, in 59 families.

References 

Populated places in Nur County